Fernando de Jesus Ribeiro (born 7 July 1984), more commonly known as Fernando is a Brazilian football goalkeeper, who currently plays for Pars Jonoubi in the Persian Gulf Pro League.

Club career

Esteghlal Khuzestan
Fernando signed with Persian Gulf Pro League club Esteghlal Khuzestan in the summer transfer window of 2015. He impressed in the first half of the 2015–16 season, keeping the most clean sheets in the first 15 games of the season. On 13 May 2016, with the help of several saves from Fernando, Esteghlal Khuzestan won their last game of the season against Zob Ahan and became the champions of the Persian Gulf Pro League for the first time in their history.

Gostaresh Foolad
Fernando joined Tabrizi side Gostaresh Foolad in the summer of 2016 after being named goalkeeper of the season in the Persian Gulf Pro League.

Honours 
Esteghlal Khuzestan
Persian Gulf Pro League (1): 2015–16

Individual
Persian Gulf Pro League Team of the Year: 2015–16
Persian Gulf Pro League Most clean sheets: 2015–16
IRFF Awards Goalkeeper of the Year: 2015–16

References

1984 births
Living people
Brazilian footballers
Persian Gulf Pro League players
Duque de Caxias Futebol Clube players
Macaé Esporte Futebol Clube players
Esteghlal Khuzestan players
Brazilian expatriate sportspeople in Iran
Expatriate footballers in Iran
Brazilian expatriate footballers
Association football goalkeepers
Gostaresh Foulad F.C. players
Pars Jonoubi Jam players
Footballers from Rio de Janeiro (city)